Luju is a town in Jiangchuan District, Yuxi, Yunnan province, China. , it has two residential neighborhoods and six villages under its administration:
 Neighborhoods
Zhongba Community
Xiaba Community

 Villages
Shiyanshao Village
Luoshipu Village
Lantian Village
Shangba Village
Hongshiyan Village
Xiao'ao Village

See also 
 List of township-level divisions of Yunnan

References 

Towns of Yunnan
Township-level divisions of Yuxi